Nangmin Station is an underground station of Busan Metro Line 4 in Nangmin-dong, Dongnae District, Busan, South Korea.

Station Layout

Gallery

Vicinity
 Exit 1: Dongnae High School
 Exit 2:
 Exit 3: Dongnae High School
 Exit 4:

External links

  php Cyber station information from Busan Transportation Corporation

Busan Metro stations
Dongnae District
Railway stations opened in 2011